The 1998 Championnat National 1 Final was the third final of the Algerian Championnat. The match took place on June 29, 1998, at Stade 5 Juillet 1962 in Algiers with kick-off at 14:00. USM El Harrach beat USM Alger 3-0 to win their first Algerian Championnat.

Championnat National

Group A

Group B

Championship final

Details

MATCH OFFICIALS 
Assistant referees:
 Oukil
 Briksi
Fourth official:
 ?

MAN OF THE MATCH
 

MATCH RULES
 90 minutes.
 30 minutes of extra-time if necessary.
 Penalty shootout if scores still level.
 Seven named substitutes.
 Maximum of three substitutions.

References

External links
1997–98 Algerian Championnat National

Algerian Ligue Professionnelle 1 finals
1
Algeria
USM Alger matches